Jan Hammenecker (Mariekerke, 2 October 1878-Westrode, 13 June 1932) was a Flemish Roman Catholic priest and writer. One of his pupils was Gerard Walschap.

Bibliography
 Verzen (1908)
 Van Christus' apostelen (1913)
 Oorlogsgetijden (?)
 Zoo zuiver als een ooge (heiligenleven, 1918)
 Gebeden voor het H. Hart (1919)
 Voor een ziel (1922)
 Colloquia I (1923)
 Excubiae (1926)
 Colloquia II (1929)
 Bloemlezing uit zijn werk (1934)

See also
 Flemish literature

Sources
 Jan Hammenecker
 Jan Hammenecker
 Jan Hammenecker-monument (located in Klein-Brabant)

1878 births
1932 deaths
Flemish priests
Flemish writers
People from Bornem